Juan Isidro Jimenes Pereyra (November 15, 1846 – May 9, 1919) was a Dominican political figure. He served as the president of the Dominican Republic between 15 November 1899 and 2 May 1902, and again between 5 December 1914 and 7 May 1916.

Jimenes was one of the main leaders of the Los Bolos, Blue party or Jimenistas, opposed to the Los Coludos or Horacistas, led by Horacio Vásquez.

He was married to Josefa de los Santos Domínguez. Los Santos spoke French and read poetry and spiritual books.

He is buried in the Catedral de Santa María la Menor.

References

External links

|-

|-

1846 births
1919 deaths
19th-century Dominican Republic politicians
20th-century Dominican Republic politicians
People from Santo Domingo 
Dominican Republic people of Spanish descent
Presidents of the Dominican Republic
Blue Party (Dominican Republic) politicians
White Dominicans